Matters of the Heart is the sixth studio album by American country music group Restless Heart. It was released by RCA Nashville in 1994. "Baby Needs New Shoes" was the only single released from the album. This is also the band's first album not to feature keyboardist Dave Innis, who left in 1993.

Entertainment Weekly gave the album a "C", with critic Alanna Nash saying that it had "more interesting country material" but that the band's sound was still "by the book".

Track listing
"In This Little Town" (John Dittrich, Rick Bowles, Josh Leo) - 3:16
"Love Train" (Paul Gregg, Rob Crosby, Scott Hendricks) - 2:58
"Mind Over Matters of the Heart" (Gary Cotton, Crosby) - 3:10
"Baby Needs New Shoes" (Ronnie Guilbeau, Billy Crain, Thom McHugh) - 3:11
"Hold You Now" (Greg Jennings, Stan Lynch, Rafe Van Hoy) - 3:25
"She's Still in Love" (Tommy Polk, Johnny Neel) - 3:33
"You're a Stronger Man Than I Am" (Dittrich, Bowles, Marc Beeson) - 3:23
"Hometown Boy" (Kerry Chater, Lynn Gillespie Chater, Tom Paden) - 3:30
"Sweet Whiskey Lies" (Dittrich, Bowles, Beeson) - 3:30
"I'd Cross the Line" (Dittrich, Gregg, Jennings, Bowles) - 3:24

Personnel 
Adapted from Matters of the Heart liner notes.
Restless Heart
 John Dittrich – vocals, drums (2-10)
 Paul Gregg – vocals, bass guitar (1, 3-8, 10)
 Greg Jennings – vocals, guitars, mandolin

Additional musicians
 Bill Cuomo – keyboards
 Carl Marsh – keyboards
 Hawk Wolinski – acoustic piano, Hammond B3 organ
 Dan Dugmore – steel guitar
 Mike Brignardello – bass guitar (2)
 Roy Huskey Jr. – upright bass (2)
 Duncan Mullins – bass guitar (9)
 Chad Cromwell – drums (1)
 Stuart Duncan – fiddle

Production
 Restless Heart – producers
 Josh Leo – producer 
 Steve Marcantonio – recording, mixing
 Pete Martinez – second engineer
 John Hurley – additional mix engineer
 Don Cobb – digital editing
 Denny Purcell – mastering
 Georgetown Masters (Nashville, Tennessee) – editing and mastering location 
 Joe Johnston – production coordinator 
 Mary Hamilton – art direction 
 Julie Wanca – art design 
 Tamara Reynolds – photography 
 Ann Rice – stylist 
 Deborah Wingo – make-up 
 The Fitzgerald/Hartley Co. – management

References

External links
[ Matters of the Heart] at Allmusic

1994 albums
Restless Heart albums
RCA Records albums
Albums produced by Josh Leo